Hariyanto Panto (born 4 November 1998), is an Indonesian professional footballer who plays as a left winger or attacking midfielder for Liga 2 club Sulut United.

Club career

Badak Lampung
He was signed for Badak Lampung to play in Liga 1 in the 2019 season. Panto made his debut on 30 June 2019 in a match against Bali United. On 16 August 2019, Panto scored his first goal for Badak Lampung against Bhayangkara in the 69th minute at the Patriot Candrabaga Stadium, Bekasi.

Persik Kediri
In 2021, Hariyanto Panto signed a contract with Indonesian Liga 1 club Persik Kediri. He made his league debut on 27 August 2021, in a 1–0 loss against Bali United as substitute at the Gelora Bung Karno Stadium, Jakarta.

Career statistics

Club

References

External links
 Hariyanto Panto at Soccerway
 Hariyanto Panto at Liga Indonesia

1998 births
Living people
Indonesian footballers
Liga 1 (Indonesia) players
Liga 2 (Indonesia) players
Badak Lampung F.C. players
Badak Lampung F.C.
Association football midfielders
People from Kendari